The 1910 South Carolina gubernatorial election was held on November 8, 1910, to select the governor of the state of South Carolina. Coleman Livingston Blease won the Democratic primary and ran unopposed in the general election to become the 90th governor of South Carolina.

Democratic primary
By 1910, the South Carolina Democratic Party had split into two factions: the well-to-do farmers with ties to Clemson College, and the tenant farmers who largely did not benefit from many of the proposals instituted by Benjamin Tillman and his followers. Many of these poor farmers escaped the fields to the relative prosperity of a mill town. Coleman Livingston Blease, a lawyer from Newberry, sought to portray himself as the candidate for the downtrodden and oppressed white man who had not benefited from the Tillman era. Blease and prohibitionist candidate Claudius Cyprian Featherstone emerged as the front runners in the Democratic primary on August 30. Featherstone and his conservative allies attacked Blease for his coarse behavior, similar to A.C. Haskell's attacks on Tillman in the gubernatorial election of 1890, but once again the attacks only strengthened the candidacy of the antagonist. On September 13, Blease won by just over 5,000 votes in the runoff to essentially become the next governor of South Carolina because there was no opposition in the general election.

General election
The general election was held on November 8, 1910, and Coleman Livingston Blease was elected the next governor of South Carolina without opposition. Being a non-presidential election and few contested races, turnout was much less than the previous gubernatorial election.

 

|-
| 
| colspan=5 |Democratic hold
|-

See also
Governor of South Carolina
List of governors of South Carolina
South Carolina gubernatorial elections

References

External links
SCIway Biography of Coleman Livingston Blease

1910 United States gubernatorial elections
1910
Gubernatorial
November 1910 events